The long-tailed nightjar (Caprimulgus climacurus) is a species of nightjar in the family Caprimulgidae. It is found in multiple African countries including Angola, Benin, Burkina Faso, Cameroon, Central African Republic, Chad, Republic of the Congo, Democratic Republic of the Congo, Ivory Coast, Eritrea, Ethiopia, Gabon, Gambia, Ghana, Guinea, Guinea-Bissau, Kenya, Liberia, Mali, Mauritania, Niger, Nigeria, Senegal, Sierra Leone, Sudan, Tanzania, Togo and Uganda . 

It is favoured habitat on the ground where litters  of trees, weeds and bushes providing suitable condition matching with its colour.

References

long-tailed nightjar
Birds of Sub-Saharan Africa
long-tailed nightjar
Taxa named by Louis Jean Pierre Vieillot
Taxonomy articles created by Polbot